Pontus Hanson (24 May 1884 – 4 December 1962) was a Swedish water polo player and swimmer, who won a bronze medal at the 1908 Summer Olympics in the 200 m breaststroke. In water polo he won bronze medals in 1908 and 1920 and a silver in 1912. His brother Sven competed in the 200 m breaststroke at the 1912 Olympics.

Hanson worked as a government official, and in parallel took active part in the development of swimming in Sweden, acting as a sports functionary in 1905–1922.

See also
 Sweden men's Olympic water polo team records and statistics
 Dual sport and multi-sport Olympians
 List of Olympic medalists in swimming (men)
 List of Olympic medalists in water polo (men)

References

External links
 

1884 births
1962 deaths
Swedish male water polo players
Swedish male breaststroke swimmers
Olympic swimmers of Sweden
Olympic water polo players of Sweden
Swimmers at the 1908 Summer Olympics
Swimmers at the 1912 Summer Olympics
Water polo players at the 1908 Summer Olympics
Water polo players at the 1912 Summer Olympics
Water polo players at the 1920 Summer Olympics
Olympic silver medalists for Sweden
Olympic bronze medalists for Sweden
Olympic bronze medalists in swimming
Olympic medalists in water polo
Stockholms KK swimmers
Medalists at the 1920 Summer Olympics
Medalists at the 1912 Summer Olympics
Medalists at the 1908 Summer Olympics
Olympic silver medalists in swimming
Stockholms KK water polo players